Chauhan Indravati Inter College is a private secondary school located Near Communal Health Centre (CHC), Anupshahar Road, Jawan Sikandarpur, Aligarh district, Uttar Pradesh, India, near Kasimpur Power House. It covers kindergarten through High School.

Affiliation
It is affiliated to:  
Uttar Pradesh Board of High School and Intermediate Education,
National Institute of Open Schooling.
Jamia Urdu, Aligarh

References

Private schools in Uttar Pradesh
Primary schools in Uttar Pradesh
High schools and secondary schools in Uttar Pradesh
Intermediate colleges in Uttar Pradesh
Education in Aligarh district
Educational institutions established in 2002
2002 establishments in Uttar Pradesh